George Ivar Louis Mountbatten, 4th Marquess of Milford Haven (born 6 June 1961), styled Earl of Medina before 1970, is a British peer and businessman.

Biography

Family
Lord Milford Haven is the elder son of the 3rd Marquess of Milford Haven and Janet Mercedes Bryce, the older brother of Lord Ivar Mountbatten and a descendant of Queen Victoria, Catherine the Great, Alexander Pushkin, and Abram Gannibal. At the death of his father on 14 April 1970, he became the 4th Marquess of Milford Haven and head of the House of Mountbatten. He is second cousin to Charles III through both of their fathers.

Lord Milford Haven married first Sarah Georgina Walker (born London, Middlesex, 17 November 1961/2), former wife of Andreas Antoniou (married 1985; divorced 1987), daughter of George Alfred Walker and Jean Maureen (née Hatton), in London on 8 March 1989. The couple were divorced on 27 February 1996 and she married in June 2016 Michael Spencer, Lord Spencer of Alresford. They had two children:
 
 Lady Tatiana Helen Georgia Mountbatten (born London, 16 April 1990) who works in public relations. She married on 23 July 2022, at Winchester Cathedral, Alexander 'Alick' Bernard Molyneux Dru (born 1991), son of Bernard Auberon Alexander Dru and Catherine Margaret Norden (and great-grandson of Colonel Aubrey Herbert, great-great-grandson of Henry Herbert, 4th Earl of Carnarvon and of John Vesey, 4th Viscount de Vesci and great-nephew by marriage of Evelyn Waugh).

 Henry (Harry) David Louis Mountbatten, Earl of Medina (born 19 October 1991)
Lord Milford Haven subsequently married Clare Husted Steel (born Manhattan, New York, New York County, New York, 2 September 1960) at Coatue Point, Nantucket, Nantucket County, Massachusetts, on 20 August 1997, without issue.

Career
In 2000, he founded uSwitch, a website which helps consumers compare and change suppliers of various services. The company was sold to the American media firm E. W. Scripps in March 2006 for around £210 million ($400 million).

He plays polo, and Julian Hipwood has coached his teams. He won the Queen's Cup with the Broncos team in 1988 and reached the 2006 final.

Arms

References

External links
 

1961 births
Living people
George
British people of German descent
British people of Russian descent
British people of Peruvian descent
People educated at Heatherdown School
British businesspeople
English polo players
English people of German descent 
English people of Russian descent 
English people of Peruvian descent 
Marquesses of Milford Haven
Milford Haven